The proclamation of the Kingdom of Italy happened with a normative act of the Savoyard Kingdom of Sardinia — the law 17 March 1861, n. 4761 — with which Victor Emmanuel II assumed for himself and for his successors the title of King of Italy. 17 March is commemorated annually by the anniversary of the unification of Italy, a national holiday established in 1911 on the occasion of the 50th anniversary, and also celebrated, in the Republican era, in 1961 and 2011.

History

Following the Second Italian War of Independence and the Expedition of the Thousand, led by Giuseppe Garibaldi, in the two-year period 1859-60, the goal of the unification of Italy had been largely achieved, with the sole exception of the Triveneto and Lazio. The annexation to the Kingdom of Sardinia of the various provinces had been sanctioned by a series of plebiscites. However, the new state still carried the name of Kingdom of Sardinia.

On 18 February 1861, the new Parliament, already known as the Italian Parliament, met in Turin, at Palazzo Carignano, formerly the seat of the Parliament of the Kingdom of Sardinia, even though it was numbered as VIII, thus continuing the numbering of the legislatures of the Kingdom of Sardinia. The Chamber of Deputies of the Kingdom of Italy also included parliamentarians elected in the "new provinces", while the Senate of the Kingdom of Italy, not elected but appointed by the king, had been integrated with appointments of senators from different parts of Italy.

The opening of the new legislature took place with the speech of the Crown pronounced by the King. The Senate in the reply voted on 26 February spoke explicitly of a new realm. The Chamber of Deputies in the response speech to Victor Emmanuel II of Savoy, written by Giuseppe Ferrari and dated 13 March 1861, already declared that:

Immediately after the start of the legislature, on 21 February, the then Prime Minister Camillo Benso, Count of Cavour presented to the Senate a bill, consisting of a single article, to formalize the new name of the King. This became law on 17 March 1861, with the publication in the Official Journal of the Kingdom of Italy n.67. 17 March is commemorated annually by the anniversary of the unification of Italy, a national holiday established in 1911 on the occasion of the 50th anniversary.

The law
The royal decree read:

In the Report Cavour recalled that

However, in the text approved by the Senate a second article also appears on the question of the heading of legislative acts. It was therefore established that:

The numeral of Victor Emmanuel of Savoy continued to be "second", not "first", as a sign of the continuity of the House of Savoy dynasty which had achieved Italian unification and of the continuity of the Statuto Albertino.

Citations

External links 

Statutory law
Kingdom of Italy
Italian unification
Kingdom of Italy (1861–1946)
1861 documents